Overnight is a 2003 American documentary film by Tony Montana and Mark Brian Smith. The film details the rise and stumble of filmmaker and musician Troy Duffy, the writer-director of The Boondock Saints, and was filmed at his request.

Duffy is presented as a victim of his own ego, and as the film progresses and his fortunes fade, he becomes increasingly abusive to his friends, relatives and business partners. According to co-director Montana, "Troy seemed to revel in the attention of Hollywood's lights and our cameras. Only three times during the production did he ask not to be filmed. It was on those occasions that he threatened us."

Synopsis
In 1997, bartender Troy Duffy (an aspiring screenwriter and member of the band The Brood) successfully sells his script for The Boondock Saints to Miramax chief Harvey Weinstein for $300,000 and is taken on by the William Morris Agency. Weinstein agrees to let Duffy, who has never made a movie or attended film school, direct the $15 million film. Moreover, The Brood will produce the soundtrack and get a recording contract from Maverick Records, and Weinstein will buy J. Sloan's, the Los Angeles bar where Duffy works, and hire Duffy to run it. Meanwhile, Duffy asks friends Tony Montana and Mark Brian Smith to manage The Brood and document his activities on film.

Duffy initially enjoys his new success, entertaining celebrities in his bar, dining at hotel restaurants, and moving into a production office where he holds teleconferences with major Hollywood producers. The movie deal quickly turns sour, largely due to Duffy's own arrogance and increasingly abusive behavior. Believing himself to be the next power-player in Hollywood, Duffy insults actors who are in consideration for The Boondock Saints (including Ethan Hawke, Keanu Reeves, and Kenneth Branagh, whose name Duffy repeatedly mispronounces before simply calling him "cunt"), as well as producers such as Jerry Bruckheimer. When the film fails to go into production as quickly as Duffy would like, he threatens to leave William Morris in favor of a rival agency, and alienates both Weinstein and his own production team through his abrasive behavior. Ultimately, Duffy receives word of rumors that Weinstein, one of the most powerful producers in Hollywood, has had him blacklisted. Miramax puts the film in turnaround, conference calls are refused, and soon Duffy is without any film industry contacts at all.

Duffy's musical efforts are equally ill-fated. Famed guitarist Jeff "Skunk" Baxter expresses interest in producing The Brood, singling out lead vocalist Taylor for particular praise. During recording sessions with Baxter and producer Ron Saint Germain, Duffy attempts to wrest control away from them, ignores any advice that contradicts his own opinions, and refuses to listen to Baxter's concerns about the band's heavy alcohol consumption. After being dropped by Maverick Records, Duffy and his band are signed to Atlantic Records. Renaming themselves The Boondock Saints, their debut CD sells only 690 copies, and they are dropped from the label shortly before disbanding.

In 1998, Duffy is finally able to obtain financing for the film through Franchise Pictures, although it totals less than half of Miramax's offer. The Boondock Saints is promoted at the 1999 Cannes Film Festival, but all the major American distribution companies pass on it. The film manages to receive a limited release in five cities, but performs poorly and is pulled after a week before being released on DVD and VHS. On the night of the film's screening at the Palm Springs Film Festival, Duffy and producer Chris Brinker are almost killed by a car jumping the curb and speeding off; the car and its driver remain unidentified. Although positive reviews of the movie begin to spread via word-of-mouth and the film becomes a financial success, Duffy's contract with Franchise Films stipulates he cannot profit from the film's television, home media, or foreign sales. He eventually spends all of the money he earned from his film and record deals, his bar closes, and he is unable to secure any work in Hollywood within six years after the production of The Boondock Saints.

Cast

Troy Duffy
Tony Montana
Mark Brian Smith
Taylor Duffy
Tate Duffy
Tyson Duffy
Marie Duffy
Gordon Clark
Jimi Jackson
Chris Brinker
Dave Zerr
Jim Crabbe
Ramses Ishak
Joel Roman
Cassian Elwes
Shaun Hill
Sharon Waxman
Jeff "Skunk" Baxter
Ron Saint Germain
Eric Greenspan
Jason Flom
Sean Patrick Flanery
Norman Reedus
David Della Rocco
Billy Connolly
Ron Jeremy
Willem Dafoe
Mark Wahlberg
Jake Busey
John Goodman

Reception
Overnight received positive reviews. On Rotten Tomatoes, it has a 78% fresh rating, based on 77 reviews. The consensus says, "This absorbing but wince-inducing documentary is a cautionary tale about the costs of hubris in the world of indie film." Roger Ebert gave Overnight 3-out-of-4 stars, writing, "[Duffy's] family, we sense during one scene, has been listening to this blowhard for a lifetime, and although they are happy to share his success, they're sort of waiting to see how he screws up. ... So are we."

Comedian Adam Carolla listed Overnight as one of his favorite films in his 2010 book, In 50 Years We'll All Be Chicks. In November 2011, Carolla released an interview with Troy Duffy on his podcast The Adam Carolla Show. Duffy acknowledged that he was not on his best behavior while the documentary was filming, but insisted that Overnight was edited unfairly to make him appear like a "boorish asshole."

References

External links

2003 films
2003 documentary films
American documentary films
Documentary films about film directors and producers
Films set in 1997
Films set in 1998
Films set in 1999
Films set in 2000
Films shot in Los Angeles
Films shot in Massachusetts
Films shot in France
Films shot in Mexico
Films shot in Toronto
2000s English-language films
2000s American films